John Kennedy McCormick (1887 or 1888–  20 August 1958) was a unionist politician in Northern Ireland.
McCormick, from  Donard View, Donaghcloney, worked as a company director and joined the Ulster Unionist Party.  Despite having no previous political experience, he was elected to the Senate of Northern Ireland in 1947, filling in the vacancy caused by the death of William Sinclair Kingan in late 1946. He served until his death in 1958.

References

1880s births
1958 deaths
Year of birth uncertain
Members of the Senate of Northern Ireland 1945–1949
Members of the Senate of Northern Ireland 1949–1953
Members of the Senate of Northern Ireland 1953–1957
Members of the Senate of Northern Ireland 1957–1961
Ulster Unionist Party members of the Senate of Northern Ireland